is a Japanese politician and the current mayor of Takamatsu, the capital city of Kagawa Prefecture, Japan.

References

External links
  

1959 births
University of Tokyo alumni 
Living people
Mayors of places in Japan
Politicians from Kagawa Prefecture